Henry Leslie Cockerill (14 January 1894 – 1960) was an English professional footballer who played as a left half in the Football League for Reading, Bristol City, Luton Town and Merthyr Town.

Career statistics

References

Footballers from Tyne and Wear
English footballers
Luton Town F.C. players
English Football League players
Association football wing halves
Mid Rhondda F.C. players
Bristol City F.C. players
Reading F.C. players
Merthyr Town F.C. players
1894 births
1960 deaths
Southern Football League players